The Ntuli people were a zulu clan in South Africa that held their own chiefdom title. They lived along the bank of the Thukela River in Kwazulu-Natal.

History 
Under the leadership of Godide kaNdlela and Mavumengwana kaNdlela, sons of Ndlela kaSompisi, they played a major part in the zulu counterraid at Middle Drift in June 1879. After the partition of Zululand they were placed in John Robert Dunn's chiefdom.

Conflicts where the Ntuli were involved 
 Middle Drift raid in June 1879.
 Battle of Isandlwana.

See also 
 Ndlela kaSompisi

Further reading 
 John Laband, Historical Dictionary of the Zulu Wars,The screcrow press, 2009. 
 John Laband, Kingdom in Crisis: The Zulu Response to the British Invasion of 1879, Manchester University Presse, 1992.
 Mzala, Gatsha Buthelezi : Chief with a Double Agenda,  Zed Books, 1988.
 John Laband, Paul Singer Thompson, Kingdom and Colony at War: Sixteen Studies on the Anglo-Zulu War of 1879, University of Natal Press, 1990.
 Ian Knight, Companion to the Anglo-Zulu War, Pen and Sword Military, 2008.
 Colin de B. Webb, John B. Wright, The James Stuart Archive of Recorded Oral Evidence Relating to the History of the Zulu and Neighbouring Peoples, Volume 4, University of Natal Press, 1986.

References 

Zulu topics
Ethnic groups in South Africa
Zulu history